Sistrans is a community in the district of Innsbruck-Land in the Austrian state of Tyrol located 4 km southeast above the capital on the highlands.

Population

References

External links

Cities and towns in Innsbruck-Land District